Kunowo  is a village in the administrative district of Gmina Kobylanka, within Stargard County, West Pomeranian Voivodeship, in north-western Poland. 

The village has a population of 636.

See also 
 History of Pomerania

References

Kunowo